Baleshare is a flat tidal island in the Outer Hebrides of Scotland. Baleshare lies to the south-west of North Uist. Its economics and community were boosted by the building of a causeway in 1962. It has a population of 49 living in two settlements: Samhla and Teananachar.

Place names and locations 
The name means "east farm" or "east town". The "west town" may have been on land that was said to exist to the west of Baleshare, washed away in the sixteenth century, over which it was possible to walk to the Monach Islands at low tide. Another story suggests there was once a land bridge to Kirkibost,  to the north. The basis for this seems to be a reference in the Exchequer Rolls for 1542 that the valued rental had been decreased due to encroachment by the sea at some unspecified (presumably recent) date.

Archaeology 
Two prehistoric settlements have been uncovered, which contain the remains of a circular stone house and pieces of pottery, bone and metal. In common with other sites in the area, they are threatened by coastal erosion.

Baelshare was chosen as one of the pilot projects for the Shorewatch programme, which aimed to training community groups to search for new archaeological sites and record information on them to be passed on to local and national archives. In the first year of the pilot project, 2005, the island was severely affected by storms. In some cases, up to 50 metres of the coast were lost in a single night. Between August and December 2005, up to four metres of archaeological remains were lost to erosion.

Notable people from Baleshare
 John Fergusson, Nova Scotia politician.

References

External links 
A photographic survey of an eroding site at Baile Sear 

Uist islands
Tidal islands of Scotland